Harry's Mad was a children's television programme that was shown on CITV in the United Kingdom between 4 January 1993 and 11 March 1996. It is based upon a book written by Dick King-Smith. Steve Attridge originally adapted the book and wrote most of the first 3 series.

Premise

The show begins when Harry Holdsworth (Gareth Parrington) inherits his American great-uncle George's macaw named Madison. At first, the Holdsworth family are not very pleased with their new pet, but they soon start to notice that Madison is no ordinary parrot, and that he is highly intelligent and very articulate. He becomes an instant family member. As well as getting the Holdsworths out of many problems, Madison is also the cause of many too. Terry Crumm (Mark Billingham) hears about Madison's intelligence and sets out to steal him on many occasions, but most of the time Madison foils his plans and saves the day.

In the third series, the family sell their house and move to a rather run down hotel which they took over when Aunt Agatha moved to America. Harry is studying for his GCSEs back at his old school and so is not featured much in this series. Instead, Hattie, played by Amy Butterworth, and Jools, played by Richard Castillo, Aunt Agatha's adopted children, take his place.

In the fourth and final series, Jools leaves the family and Harry returns from his GCSEs.

Many guest stars appeared in Harry's Mad including Dave Lee Travis, Michaela Strachan and Steve Davis.

The parrot
Madison was played by a living parrot in only certain scenes that required the view of his full body, such as when he was flying or perched on Harry's arm. In most other scenes, however, an animatronic parrot was used to allow Madison to talk and interact with other characters properly.

Trivia
Although the animatronic parrot was mostly accurate, there is one revealing mistake, the animatronic parrot has a totally grey beak while the real parrot has a black and white beak.
Whilst Madison is a macaw in this series, in the original book, he is an African grey parrot.

References

External links
 .

1990s British children's television series
1993 British television series debuts
1996 British television series endings
ITV children's television shows
ITV comedy
ITV television dramas
British television shows featuring puppetry
Television series by ITV Studios
English-language television shows
Television shows produced by Central Independent Television